Flensjøen is a lake on the border of Innlandet and Trøndelag counties in Norway. The  lake lies in the municipalities of Røros (in Trøndelag county) and Os (in Innlandet county).

See also
List of lakes in Norway

References

	

Røros
Os, Innlandet
Lakes of Innlandet
Lakes of Trøndelag